Lovatt is a surname. Notable people with the surname include:

Harry Lovatt (1905–1984), much-travelled English footballer
Mark Lovatt (born 1971), British road racing cyclist
Paul Lovatt-Cooper, "Composer in Association" of the Black Dyke Band
Stephen Lovatt (born 1964), New Zealand actor, plays Max Hoyland on the Australian soap Neighbours
Tom Lovatt-Williams (1897–1986), English poet and writer about railways and nature topics
George I. Lovatt, Sr. (1872–1958), US cathedral architect

See also
Lovat (disambiguation)
Lovato
Lovett (disambiguation)